The 1963 Delaware State Hornets football team represented Delaware State College—now known as Delaware State University—as a member of the Central Intercollegiate Athletic Association (CIAA) in the 1963 NCAA College Division football season. Led by coach Roy D. Moore in his fourth season, the Hornets compiled a 2–5–1 record, 1–5 in their conference. The final game of the season, against , was canceled following the assassination of John F. Kennedy.

Schedule

References

Delaware State
Delaware State Hornets football seasons
Delaware State Hornets football